The Norfolk News was a regional weekly newspaper, published every Saturday, in Exchange Street, Norwich, England.

The publication was founded in January, 1845, and ceased publication in 1961. The area it covered was the whole of Norfolk. Copies of the paper for most of its 116 years are held at the Local History Library in Norwich.

Notable editors of the paper include Edmund Rogers (1848–1870).

References

 Vox populi: the Norfolk newspaper press, 1760-1900 by R. Stedman (Library Association Thesis, London, 1971) 
 The Norwich Post: its contemporaries and successors by E. Fowler and M. Payne (Norfolk News Company, Norwich, 1951)

Defunct newspapers published in the United Kingdom
Publications established in 1845
Publications disestablished in 1961
1845 establishments in England
Newspapers published in Norfolk
1961 disestablishments in England